Ankushapur may refer to:

Ankushapur, Warangal a village in Andhra Pradesh, India
Ankushapur, Ranga Reddy a village in Andhra Pradesh, India